NABF may refer to:

National Amateur Baseball Federation, a governing body for amateur baseball in the United States
North American Boxing Federation